Sinful Colors is an American nail polish company owned by Revlon.

Background
Sinful Colors was founded in 1991.  All the products are made in USA and without formaldehyde, toluene, and DBP.

In March 2011, Mirage Cosmetics, the owners of Sinful Colors, was purchased by Revlon for 39 million dollars.

In December 2013, Revlon announced it was exiting the Chinese cosmetic market, thus pulling Sinful Colors off the Chinese shelves.

Organization
The company's headquarters is located in Beltsville, Maryland.

Products 
In 2016, Sinful Colors partnered with Kylie Jenner to launch a nail polish collection. In 2018, the brand partnered with Vanessa Hudgens to create a nail polish collection, and named her Global Color Collaborator of Sinful Colors.

In 2020, they came out a new product called the CLAWS. It is a Japanese beauty-inspired, limited-edition collection with press-on nails featuring Bebe Rexha’s designs.

They also came out with a sneaker-inspired collection with neon shades and a rubber-like matte finish.   They are sold at Target.

Another collection they have is called Sweet and Salty and is based on favorite foods such as tacos, cheese puffs, and donuts. 

On June 16, 2022, its parent, Revlon, filed for Chapter 11 bankruptcy.

References

External links
Official website

Nail polish
Cosmetics companies of the United States
Revlon brands
Companies that filed for Chapter 11 bankruptcy in 2022